The Mungo (Moungo) are an ethnic group of the Republic of Cameroon. Along with the other coastal peoples, they belong to the Sawa ethnic groups. The Mungo have historically been dominated by the Duala people, and the two groups share similar cultures, histories, and  claims of origin.

History and geography
The Mungo share no singular origin story. Some claim the same history as the Duala and Limba, descending from a man named Mbedi. From a place called Piti (northeast of Douala), Mbedi's sons Ewale and Dibongo migrated south toward the Cameroon coast. while others trace their ancestry to a man named Lokula who migrated east from near Efik territory in modern-day Nigeria. The former tradition seems more likely, however, and the Nigerian story possibly indicates that later settlers entered Limba country from Efik territories at some point and assimilated.

By the 16th century, the Duala had become the leading traders in Cameroon. The Mungo provided goods and slaves to the Duala in exchange for goods obtained from the Europeans, such as alcohol, gunpowder, guns, mirrors, shoes, textiles, and tools.

In 1918, Germany lost World War I, and her colonies became mandates of the League of Nations. Great Britain and France split the administration of the Kameruns, partitioning the Cameroonian Littoral. The Mungo were divided in two.

The Mungo live along the Mungo River's lower stretch and the creeks that feed it. Their territory straddles the border of the Moungo division of the Littoral Province and the Fako division of the Southwest Province. Fishing is the primary means of subsistence.

Language
The Mungo who speak a dialect of Duala. Duala is part of the Bantu group of the Niger–Congo language family.

In addition, individuals who have attended school or lived in an urban centre usually speak a European language. For Littoral Mungo, this is French; for Southwest Mungo, it is Cameroonian Pidgin English or standard English; and for the Mungo it is one or the other. A growing number of the Anglophones today grow up with Pidgin as their first tongue.

Arts
The Mungo are regular attendees of the annual Ngondo, a traditional festival of the Sawa peoples. The goal is to communicate with the ancestors and ask them for guidance and protection for the future. The festivities also include armed combat, beauty pageants, pirogue races, and traditional wrestling.

Classification
The Mungo are Bantu in language and origin. More narrowly, they fall into the Sawa, or the coastal peoples of Cameroon.

Notes

References
 Chrispin, Dr. Pettang, directeur. Cameroun: Guide touristique. Paris: Les Éditions Wala.
 Fanso, V. G. (1989). Cameroon History for Secondary Schools and Colleges, Vol. 1: From Prehistoric Times to the Nineteenth Century. Hong Kong: Macmillan Education Ltd.
 Gordon, Raymond G., Jr. (ed.) (2005): "Duala". Ethnologue: Languages of the World, 15th ed. Dallas: SIL International. Accessed 6 June 2006.
 Gordon, Raymond G., Jr. (ed.) (2005): "Pidgin, Cameroon". Ethnologue: Languages of the World, 15th ed. Dallas: SIL International. Accessed 6 June 2006.

External links
 Peuple Sawa (in French)

Bantu peoples
Ethnic groups in Cameroon
Indigenous peoples of West Africa